All the Stars and Boulevards is the debut album by American rock band Augustana The album was released September 6, 2005, by Epic Records.

The album's release went largely unnoticed at the time. However, the single "Boston" was used during an episode of the CW series One Tree Hill in 2006 and propelled the band into national prominence. As a result, the song was used in several other MTV and VH1 shows, and Augustana was selected as a "You Oughta Know" band by VH1. The album was then selectively re-released on September 12, 2006. "Boston" continued to be used on television into 2007, including in episodes of the series Scrubs, Shark, and The Big Bang Theory.

Critical reception 

All the Stars and Boulevards garnered a mixed reception from music critics. Gavin Edwards of Rolling Stone found the production, honest lyrics and guitar work mixing well with each other in O'Brien's control, saying that "Augustana are ready for their guest appearance on just about any WB show (OK, maybe not Reba)." Tim Sendra of AllMusic said that the band's influences that make up their overall sound felt inauthentic, with production, instrumentals and vocal dexterity being put through the studio cycle. But Sendra said that "the album is still listenable in a strange kind of way[,] since the lack of any distinguishing features allows the music to be perfect background music." Bud Scoopa of Paste said that, despite the album being well produced, he found dissonance between the lyrics and instruments mixing together.

Track listing

Re-release 
The re-released version of the album includes a re-mixed version of "Wasteland," a new track titled "Marie," and live acoustic versions of "Boston" and "Stars and Boulevards."

Personnel

Musicians 
Augustana is Dan Layus, Josiah Rosen, Jared Palomar, and Justin South.

 Dan Layus – vocals, guitar, piano
 Josiah Rosen – guitar, vocals
 Jared Palomar – bass guitar, vocals, keyboards
 Justin South – drums, percussion
 Brendan O'Brien – keyboards, percussion, backing vocals, mandolin, slide guitar, production

Production 
 Produced and mixed by Brendan O'Brien
 All songs recorded by Nick Didia
 Second engineer: Karl Egsieker
 Additional engineering: Billy Bowers
 Assistant engineer: Tom Tapley
 Mastered by Bob Ludwig at Gateway Mastering, Portland, ME
 A&R: Pete Giberga
 A&R coordinator: Samantha Benerofe
 Management: Michael Rosenblatt and Stephen Short for That Guy Management (currently known as Ping Pong Music)

References 

2005 debut albums
Augustana (band) albums
Epic Records albums
Albums produced by Brendan O'Brien (record producer)